Ronald A. Kuipers is a Canadian philosopher of religion based in Toronto, Ontario.

History 
Ronald A. Kuipers was born in Edmonton, Canada. From 1989 to 1990, Kuipers worked as the Entertainment Editor of The Gateway newspaper. In 2012, Kuipers became an Associate Professor of the philosophy of religion at the Institute for Christian Studies in Toronto, Canada.

As of 2018, Kuipers is President of the Institute for Christian Studies. He is also the Director of the ICS Centre for Philosophy, Religion, and Social Ethics.

Scholarship 
Ronald A. Kuipers began publishing in the mid-1990s. In 1997, Kuipers published his first monograph Solidarity and the Stranger, focused on the philosophy of Richard Rorty. The book was reviewed in The Review of Metaphysics, Religious Studies Review, and Studies in Religion. In 2010, Kuipers presented the "What's So Critical About Faith" lecture series at the University of Calgary and the King's University.

In 2012, Kuipers published Richard Rorty, the fifth volume in Bloomsbury's Contemporary American Thinkers series.

Bibliography 
As per OCLC WorldCat.

Solidarity and the Stranger: Themes in the Social Philosophy of Richard Rorty, 1997, 
Walking the Tightrope of Faith: Philosophical Conversations About Reason and Religion,1999, 
Critical Faith: Toward a Renewed Understanding of Religious Life and Its Public Accountability, 2002, 
Philosophy as Responsibility: A Celebration of Hendrik Hart's Contribution to the Discipline, 2002, 
Richard Rorty: Contemporary American Thinkers, 2012,

References

External links 
 Official website

20th-century Canadian philosophers
21st-century Canadian philosophers
21st-century Canadian writers
Living people
Year of birth missing (living people)